Cecilia Emma Hanhikoski (born 12 September 1989) is a Finnish deaf snowboarder and futsal player. She has represented Finland at the Deaflympics in 2007, 2015 and 2019. Cecilia has won a total of 6 medals at the Winter Deaflympics including a gold medal.

She also served as the former President of the World Federation of the Deaf Youth Section (WFDYS) from 2015 to 2019.

References 

1989 births
Living people
Finnish female snowboarders
Finnish women's futsal players
Deaf sportspeople
Finnish deaf people
Deaflympic gold medalists for Finland
Deaflympic silver medalists for Finland
Deaflympic bronze medalists for Finland
Snowboarders at the 2007 Winter Deaflympics
Snowboarders at the 2015 Winter Deaflympics
Snowboarders at the 2019 Winter Deaflympics
Medalists at the 2007 Winter Deaflympics
Medalists at the 2015 Winter Deaflympics
Medalists at the 2019 Winter Deaflympics